Commissioners' court, or in Arkansas a quorum court, is the governing body of county government in three US states: Arkansas, Texas and Missouri. It is similar in function to a board of county commissioners. A similar system was in place in the Wisconsin Territory before statehood.

The principal functions of a commissioners' or quorum Court are legislative. Although referred to as courts, they generally exercise only limited judicial powers in Texas and Missouri and none in Arkansas. Those judicial powers in Texas and Missouri include the ability to compel testimony under oath, the ability to issue citations for contempt, and the ability to make findings of fact.

In Arkansas 
In Arkansas the quorum court of a county is the legislative body of that county. The chief executive officer of each county is the county judge, who sits on the quorum court primarily as a moderator but enjoys the power of veto. The county judge is in charge of the county road system, and can fill in for circuit court judges in their absence. Each quorum court is elected from single-member districts, with the number of commissioners (called justices of the peace) depending on the population of the county.

In Texas 

The governing body of each of Texas's 254 counties is the commissioners court (spelled without the apostrophe). In Texas, the court has five members: the county judge and four commissioners. A sixth official, the county clerk, is an ex officio member of the court.

In most instances, a simple majority of court members is sufficient to take action. Three voting members of the court constitute a quorum. The commissioners court operates similar to the "weak" mayor-council system; the county judge has no veto power over the court and votes along with the other commissioners.

Counties are constitutional subdivisions of the state. As a principal institution of county government, the court's role combines elements of judicial, legislative, and executive functions. Other institutions of county government include independent elected and appointed officials, such as the sheriff, and independent boards, such as the board of judges. The Commissioners Courts in Texas are served and provided continued education by the County Judges and Commissioners Association events and the official association publication County Progress.

In Texas, the relationship between institutions of county government is designed to be independent and adversarial. In this framework, the principal power of the court is the power of the purse. Each year, the court adopts the county tax rate and the county budget, setting the salary and budget for independent elected officials, as well as outlining expenditures for departments under the direct control of the court. As the administrative head of county government, the court has the authority to enact county-wide policies, and to the extent provided by law, to enact legislation in the form of court orders. The court also exercises varying degrees of oversight over subsidiary county boards and commissioners, which may differ from county to county, but which commonly include drainage districts, irrigation districts, housing authorities and the like. In some instances, the court may also serve as the board of directors for these special districts or authorities, as well as fulfill the role of county school board.

Each voting member of the court has one vote. The county judge serves as the presiding officer of the commissioners court, while the county clerk is charged with keeping the minutes of the court, and attesting any actions it make take. State law requires, except in cases of emergency, that an agenda of the items to be considered by the court be posted at least 72 hours prior to its meeting. Among counties, the process for placing items on the agenda, and posting it, varies widely, with the task most often falling to the county judge, the county clerk, or a specially appointed court clerk.

Additionally, state law provides that the court must designate its term, or the time, place, and interval at which it will sit, at the beginning of each fiscal year. Any meeting not held according to the term is considered a special meeting. Legal precedent also provides that no action taken by the court may bind the county beyond the term of the court.

In addition to their roles on the court, the county judge, county commissioners and county clerk each have independent roles to play within county government.

The county judge serves as the chief administrator of the county, and as the presiding judge for justice and county courts. In some counties, the county judge exercises judicial functions as a probate and/or county court judge. Even in cases where county judges do not conduct judicial functions, they retain the power to conduct marriages and may also be called upon to conduct administrative hearings, such as those pertaining to liquor license applications.

Additionally, the county judge is a statutory member of several important boards, including the juvenile board and the county election commission. Finally, the judge is designated by a long-standing executive order of the governor, pursuant to the Texas Disaster Act of 1974, as the executive officer for civil defense within the county. The county judge is elected county wide to a four-year term coinciding with the term of the governor.

Each of the four county commissioners represents an area of the county, or precinct, that is designed to be roughly equal in population to each of the other such areas. In addition to serving as voting members of the court, county commissioners are often charged with overseeing county roads and bridges within their precinct, and are sometimes also responsible for solid waste collection, parks and other services within the precinct. In rural counties, the role of the county commissioner outside of the commissioners court tends to be quite substantial, while in urban counties, the delivery of county services is frequently consolidated in county-wide departments, with the bulk of a commissioner's time being devoted to the commissioners court. The commissioners are elected to staggered, four-year terms, with two taking office every other year, and are elected by the votes of the precinct represented.

The county clerk is responsible for recording legal instruments, including birth certificates, marriage licenses, deeds and titles, and for keeping the records of county and justice courts. The county clerk is also a statutory member of certain boards and commissions, such as the elections commission, and may also serve in other capacities as provided by law or local practice. They are elected county-wide to a four-year term.

In Missouri 
In 1939, Missouri enacted legislation changing from a county court system to a "county commission" in which the county commission is composed of three elected commissioners.

U. S. President Harry S. Truman began his political career in 1926 as a county judge in Jackson County, Missouri.

References

External links
"County Courts," Texas Courts Online, 13 March 2013, accessed 29 May 2013.
Missouri Revised Statutes, Chapter 49, County Commissions and County Buildings, Section 49.010

County governing bodies in the United States
Local government in Arkansas
Local government in Missouri
Local government in Texas